Krasniye Kryl'ya is a Russian aircraft manufacturer based in Taganrog. The company specializes in the design and manufacture of ultralight trikes and hang gliders.

The company is noted in Russia and eastern Europe as a producer of hang gliders and trikes, having won a world championship competition in the 1990s. Their products have not been exported widely, though.

Aircraft

References

External links

Aircraft manufacturers of Russia
Ultralight trikes
Homebuilt aircraft
Companies based in Rostov Oblast